A History of the World in Seven Cheap Things: A Guide to Capitalism, Nature, and the Future of he Planet is a book by Raj Patel and Jason W. Moore published in 2018.

Premise 

The book considers the development of Capitalism and the Anthropocene through the interrelationship of seven 'cheap things'. These are:

 Cheap Nature
 Cheap Money
 Cheap Work
 Cheap Care
 Cheap Food
 Cheap Energy
 Cheap Lives

Cheapness is defined as 'a set of strategies to manage relations between capitalism and the web of life'. Cheapness then is not just about low cost. It is rather a strategy capitalism has employed transform undenominated objects and relationships into circuits of production and consumption that have the lowest possible dollar value.

The authors adopt a world ecology approach. This approach commits to understanding human relations of power, production, and environment-making in the web of life.

Reception 
The Guardian praised the book's 'impressive ability to synthesise disparate elements'.

References 

2018 non-fiction books
University of California Press books
Verso Books books
Black Inc books